Eupraxia Vsevolodovna of Kiev (c. 1067 – 10 July 1109) (sometimes westernised as Praxedis; in Old East Slavic Еоупраксиа) was a Holy Roman Empress consort. She was the daughter of Vsevolod I, Grand Prince of Kiev, and his wife Anna Polovetskaya, daughter of a Cuman khan.  She married Henry IV of Germany in 1089 and took the name Adelaide (or Adelheid).

First marriage

Eupraxia was first married to Henry I the Long, count of Stade and margrave of the Saxon Northern March, who was the son of Lothair Udo II. Eupraxia and Henry had no children before his death in 1087.

Empress
After her first husband's death, Eupraxia went to live in the convent of Quedlinburg, where she met Henry IV, who was then the Saxon king. He was greatly impressed by her beauty. After his first wife Bertha of Savoy died in December 1087, Henry became betrothed to Eupraxia in 1088. The couple married the following year on 18 August 1089 at Cologne. Immediately after the wedding, Eupraxia was crowned and assumed the name Adelaide (or Adelheid).

During Henry's campaigns in Italy, he took Eupraxia-Adelaide with him and kept her imprisoned at the monastery of San Zeno, where the emperor and his troops traditionally stayed, just outside the walled city of Verona. She escaped in 1093 and fled to Canossa, where she sought the aid of Matilda of Tuscany, one of Henry's enemies. Eupraxia-Adelaide accused Henry of ill-treating her in a letter that was read at legatine synod held in Constance in April 1094. The following year, at the urging of Pope Urban II, Eupraxia-Adelaide made a public confession before the church Council of Piacenza, held in the first week of March. She accused Henry of holding her against her will, of forcing her to participate in orgies, and, according to some later accounts, of attempting a black mass on her naked body. According to these later chroniclers, Henry became involved in a Nicolaitan sect, and hosted the sect's orgies and obscene rituals in his palaces. Eupraxia-Adelaide was forced to participate in these orgies, and on one occasion Henry allegedly offered her to his son, Conrad. Conrad refused indignantly, and then revolted against his father. He began to support the papal side in the Italian wars which formed part of the Investiture Controversy. This legend takes its origin from the hostility between Henry and Urban II during the Investiture Controversy.

According to an account written in the mid-twelfth century, because Henry forced Eupraxia-Adelaide to take part in orgies, when she became pregnant she was unable to tell who the father of her child was. Eupraxia-Adelaide thus decided to leave Henry.
Christian Raffensperger has suggested that there might be some truth to this story, based on a reference to the death of one of Henry’s sons in Donizo’s Vita Mathildis (written c.1115). Since Henry’s children by his first wife Bertha are accounted for, according to Raffensperger this could be a child by Eupraxia-Adelaide (alternatively, it could be a reference to a child by a mistress, or simply a mistake).

Later life
Eupraxia-Adelaide left Italy for Hungary, where she lived until 1099, when she returned to Kiev. After Henry's death in 1106 she became a nun until her own death in 1109.

Notes

References
G. Vernadsky, Kievan Rus (New Haven, 1976). 
C. Raffensperger, ‘Evpraksia Vsevolodovna between East and West,’ Russian History/Histoire Russe 30:1–2 (2003), 23-34. 
C. Raffensperger, 'The Missing Russian Women: The Case of Evpraksia Vsevolodovna,' in Writing Medieval Women's Lives (ed. Goldy, Livingstone) (2012), pp. 
H. Rüß, ‘Eupraxia-Adelheid. Eine biographische Annäherung,‘ Jahrbücher für Geschichte Osteuropas 54 (2006), 481–518
I. S. Robinson, Henry IV of Germany, 1056-1106 (Cambridge, 2003). 
 G. Althoff, Heinrich IV (Darmstadt, 2006).

External links

Medieval Lands Project
Adelaide of Kiev, c.1070-1109 (subscription required)
Praxedis-Adelheid von Kiev, Deutsche  Deutsche Königin (in German)
Women of Ancient Rus (in Russian)

1060s births
1109 deaths

Year of birth uncertain
Kievan Rus' princesses
Rurik dynasty
Christian anti-Gnosticism
Salian dynasty
Holy Roman Empresses
11th-century Rus' people
11th-century Rus' women
12th-century Rus' people
12th-century Rus' women
11th-century women of the Holy Roman Empire
11th-century German women
Remarried royal consorts